Steinbach (South) Airport  is located in the Rural Municipality of Hanover, Manitoba, Canada,  south of the city of Steinbach.

See also
Steinbach Airport

References

External links
Harv's Air Service - Pilot Training & Air Taxi

Registered aerodromes in Manitoba
Transport in Steinbach, Manitoba